Peravurani N Ashokkumar formerly known as N. Ashokkumar , is a political leader, from Tamil Nadu, India. He is the currently elected Member of the Legislative Assembly of  Peravurani, Thanjavur District, Tamil Nadu, India . Driven by social consciousness, he started his political career early by joining the political party that aligned with his ideologies, Dravida Munnetra Kazhagam (DMK) in the year, 1975. As a mission driven, compassionate, empathetic, and strategic political leader, N. Ashokkumar focuses on doing good to the people of his constituency.

Personal life 
N. Ashokkumar was born on 15 April 1957 to V. Narayanasamy (father) and N. Jayam (mother) from Veeraiyankottai Village, Peravurani Taluk, Thanjavur District and settled in Peravurani Town. As a student, N. Ashok Kumar was a sports enthusiast. He completed his PUC education in Debritto School, Devakkottai, Tamil Nadu. His in laws are DMK Leader, Thiru. Misa Krishnamoorthi EX MLA & Saraswathi. He has two siblings N. Elango and N. Sumathi.

Political career 
N. Ashokkumar  is a social worker  in Peruvurani. His political career started in 1975 when he joined the Dravida Munnetra Kazhagam (DMK) party. He won in the Peruratchi election for the position of chairman in the years of 2006 and 2011.

Educationist 
As an Educationist, N. Ashokkumar had a vision to give low cost English medium education for the people of Peravurani. He co-founded the Muvendar Matriculation Higher Secondary School in Peravurani in 1985.

References 

1957 births
Dravida Munnetra Kazhagam politicians
People from Thanjavur district
Living people
Tamil Nadu MLAs 2021–2026